The TCA Award for Outstanding Achievement in Reality Programming is an award given by the Television Critics Association for reality television formats.

Winners and nominees

Multiple winners

2 wins
 The Amazing Race
 Queer Eye

Multiple nominations

6 nominations
 The Amazing Race

5 nominations
 Survivor

4 nominations
 The Great British Baking Show
 Shark Tank
 Top Chef
 The Voice

3 nominations
 Nailed It!
 RuPaul's Drag Race

2 nominations
 Cheer
 The Circus: Inside the Greatest Political Show on Earth
 Dancing with the Stars
 The Glee Project
 Legendary
 Making It
 Queer Eye
 The Real World Homecoming

Total awards by network

 Netflix – 5
 CBS – 2
 A&E – 1
 ABC – 1
 Fox – 1

 HBO Max – 1
 Logo TV – 1
 Showtime – 1
 Starz – 1

References

External links
 Official website

Reality Programming